Heyman (also Romanized as Hīman, and Hīmen; also known as Haimīn and Heymīn) is a village in Gabrik Rural District, in the Central District of Jask County, Hormozgan Province, Iran. At the 2006 census, its population was 225, in 51 families.

References 

Populated places in Jask County